Gonzalo Saucedo (born 16 February 1985) is an Argentine football midfielder  that currently plays at Primera B club Coquimbo Unido.

Career
Born in Corrientes, Saucedo began playing in Estudiantes' youth system. He joined the club's senior side in 2006 where he made his Primera debut. During his first year in the Estudiantes 1st team he helped them to win the Apertura 2006 tournament. He spent the second half of 2008 on loan to Godoy Cruz

Titles

References

External links
 
 Argentine Primera statistics 

1985 births
Living people
People from Posadas, Misiones
Argentine footballers
Association football midfielders
Estudiantes de La Plata footballers
Godoy Cruz Antonio Tomba footballers
Unión de Santa Fe footballers
Tiro Federal footballers
Central Córdoba de Santiago del Estero footballers
Villa Mitre footballers
Coquimbo Unido footballers
Primera B de Chile players
Expatriate footballers in Chile
Sportspeople from Misiones Province